The Hawker P.1052 was a British experimental aircraft built by Hawker Aircraft Limited for trials with swept wings.

Design and development
The origins of the P.1052 were in a 1945 design study by the Hawker design team for a development of the P.1040 using swept back wings. Interest was not shown by the Ministry of Supply until the spring of 1946 when Air Ministry specification E.38/46 (to undertake studies into the aerodynamic properties of swept wings) was issued, and a contract awarded in May 1947 for Hawker to supply two prototypes.

A 35 degree sweep in the wings was the most significant aerodynamic innovation in the P.1052, relative to the P.1040. This feature was developed in conjunction with the RAE at Farnborough. In addition, the tailplane was cropped to a shorter span (by removing the rounded tips on the P.1040) and was adjustable in incidence to allow changes in trim at the anticipated higher speeds.

The first prototype (VX272) was ready in time for static exhibition at the 1948 S.B.A.C Farnborough display, but permission was withheld on grounds of secrecy. It first flew on 19 November 1948, with the second prototype (VX279) flying  on 13 April 1949.

In late 1949 or early 1950, following tests on a third, non-flying airframe, VX272 had both wings and fuselage strengthened. At around the same time, VX279 was fitted with a variable incidence tailplane.

During 1950, VX279 was significantly rebuilt, with a single jet outlet and swept empennage; it was subsequently given a separate designation, as the Hawker P.1081.

VX272 was retro-fitted with the original rear fuselage of VX279 – after strengthening and installation of an arrestor hook. VX272 was also fitted with a bullet-type fairing at the tailplane-fin intersection, which improved its high-speed behaviour.

In May 1952, with the addition of a long-stroke undercarriage (from a Sea Hawk), VX272 undertook take-off and landing trials on board .  In June the same year, it received a final modification: a variable incidence swept tailplane, after which it flew high-speed trials with the RAE. These were terminated and VX272 was removed from service in September 1953, following a forced landing.

The focus of research at Hawker was transferred to the P.1067, which would become better known as the Hawker Hunter. No further examples of the P.1052 were built. In hindsight, the P.1052 may be seen as part of a transition from the centrifugally powered, straight-winged Sea Hawk to the axially powered, swept-wing Hunter.

The P.1078 – a  variant in which the P.1052 was to have been augmented by a small built-in rocket engine (i.e. the Armstrong Siddeley Snarler),  became the subject of a design study. However, because work on another rocket-powered design – the P.1040-based Hawker P.1072 (which had un-swept wings) – was significantly advanced, the P.1078 was never built.

Aircraft on display
The first prototype VX272 is displayed at the Fleet Air Arm Museum, Yeovilton.

Operators

 Royal Aircraft Establishment

Specifications (P.1052)

Citations

Bibliography

Further reading

 Green, William and Cross, Roy. The Jet Aircraft of the World. London: Macdonald and Company, 1955.
 Hannah, Donald. Hawker FlyPast Reference Library. Stamford, Lincolnshire, UK: Key Publishing Ltd., 1982. .
 James, Derek N. Hawker, an Aircraft Album No. 5. New York: Arco Publishing Company, 1973. . (First published in the UK by Ian Allan in 1972)
 Mason, Francis K. Hawker Aircraft since 1920. London: Putnam, 1991. 

1940s British experimental aircraft
P1052
Single-engined jet aircraft
Mid-wing aircraft
Cruciform tail aircraft
Aircraft first flown in 1948